Cesar Chavez (born October 30, 1987) is a Mexican-American singer and politician. A member of the Democratic Party, he served in the Arizona House of Representatives, representing Arizona's 29th legislative district, from 2017 to 2023. Prior to entering politics, Chavez travelled internationally as a Mariachi vocalist. Chavez is a 2022 candidate to fill the open seat of outgoing State Senator Martín Quezada.

Early life 
Chavez was born in Moroleon, Guanajuato, and immigrated to the United States at the age of three. He is the oldest of three children born to Nicolas Chavez and Maria Martinez.

Arizona House of Representatives (2017-2023) 
In 2016, Chavez and incumbent Richard C. Andrade won the Democratic primary. They went on to defeat Republican John Wilson in the general election.

He is openly gay, and serves alongside two other openly LGBT legislators: Daniel Hernández Jr. and Robert Meza. On October 11, 2017, (National Coming Out Day), the three lawmakers announced the creation of an LGBTQ Caucus in the legislature.

In 2020, he endorsed Mike Bloomberg for President at a rally in Downtown Phoenix where he introduced him.

In 2022, Chavez ran for the Arizona Senate, but lost to political newcomer Anna Hernandez in the Democratic primary in August 2022.

Life after the Legislature
After, Ruben Gallego announced his retirement from the United States House of Representatives to run against U.S. Senator against Kyrsten Sinema in 2024, Chavez is considered a potential candidate to run for his sear.

References

External links 
 Biography at Ballotpedia

American politicians of Mexican descent
Democratic Party members of the Arizona House of Representatives
Politicians from Phoenix, Arizona
Living people
1987 births
LGBT state legislators in Arizona
Gay politicians
Hispanic and Latino American state legislators in Arizona
LGBT Hispanic and Latino American people
Mexican emigrants to the United States
21st-century American politicians
People from Moroleón
Politicians from Guanajuato
21st-century LGBT people